The Connecticut Skyhawks were a men's spring-professional basketball team in the United States Basketball League.

History
The Skyhawks were founded in 1985 as the Connecticut Colonels. The Colonels suspended operations until the 1988 season, when the team was re-branded as the New Haven Skyhawks. The Skyhawks would defeat the Palm Beach Stingrays for the USBL Championship that season, 134–126. Following their return to the league, the USBL suspended operations for all teams until 1990. After the return of the league in 1990, the Skyhawks would continue to carry the New Haven banner, until 1993, when the team rebranded to the Connecticut Skyhawks. During the 1999 season, the Skyhawks would lose to the defending champions, Atlantic City Seagulls, in that season's championship game 83–77. The Skyhawks would dissolve following that season.

Season-by-season records

References

United States Basketball League teams
Defunct basketball teams in Connecticut